Skrypnyk may refer to:
Mykola Skrypnyk (1872–1933), Bolshevik politician and statesman in interwar Soviet Ukraine
Patriarch Mstyslav (Skrypnyk) (1898–1993), secular name Stepan Ivanovych Skrypnyk, prominent Ukrainian Orthodox Church hierarch
 Oleksiy Skrypnyk (1964), a Ukrainian politician.

See also
 

Ukrainian-language surnames